Minto Reef is a largely submerged atoll belonging to Pohnpei State in  Micronesia.

Description
Minto Reef encloses a lagoon of about 25 to 30 km2 in area. There are several boat passages into the lagoon on the southern side. It is at the same time the westernmost and northernmost feature of Pohnpei State. The nearest land is Oroluk Atoll 93 km to the southeast. Close to the northern extremity of the atoll there is a sandbank, about 1.8 meters high.

Minto Reef is the site of Minto Reef Marina Area of Biodiversity Significance, with a total area of 4,204.2 ha.

Administration
Minto Reef is part of Oroluk municipality, along with Oroluk Atoll.
The State of Pohnpei in 1999 created the Minto Reef Marine Sanctuary.

References

Atolls of the Federated States of Micronesia
Pohnpei